Victoria Lindpaintner (born 13 February 1918 in Frankfurt am Main; died 29 April 1965 at the Tegernsee, Bavaria) was a German figure skater. She was the 1936 German national champion and represented Germany at the 1936 Winter Olympics, where she placed 8th.

Biography
Lindpaintner represented the club Berliner SC. She married Count Hans Heribert of Törring-Jettenbach (son of Duchess Sophie Adelheid in Bavaria) in October 1938 but the two later divorced and she married Rudolf Hantschel in December 1947.

Competitive highlights

References

German female single skaters
1918 births
1965 deaths
Figure skaters at the 1936 Winter Olympics
Olympic figure skaters of Germany
Sportspeople from Frankfurt